Lalchhuanmawia Fanai (born 14 April 1989), is an Indian professional footballer who plays as a defender.

Career

JCT
Chhuantea started his professional career from Punjab-based team JCT FC, where he has played for them Punjab Football League and in I-League for 2 years. He has also represented Punjab in Santosh Trophy.

Shillong Lajong
Chhuantea played for Shillong Lajong from 2012 to 2014 and made 30 appearances. On 4 November 2012, Chhuantea made his debut for Lajong against United S.C. in which Lajong won by 3–2.,after that Chhuantea score the winning goal for his new team Lajong won by 1–0 against HAL Bangalore

Bengaluru
In July 2014, it was announced that Chhuantea signed one-year deal with Bengaluru FC. On 24 January 2015, Chhuantea made his debut for Bengaluru FC against Pune FC at Bengalore Football Stadium. In his debut season with Bengaluru, he has made 16 appearances and has helped them to win I-League. On 4 February 2015, Chhuantea made his AFC Champions League debut against Johor Darul Ta'zim at Larkin Stadium Malaysia. He signed a two-year contract with Bengaluru at the end of the season, which would keep him at the club until the end of the 2016-17 I-League season.

Mumbai City (loan)
In July 2015 Chhuantea was drafted to play for Mumbai City FC in the 2015 Indian Super League. He made total 9 appearances for Mumbai City in whole ISL season.

Pune City
On 23 July 2017, Fanai has been picked up by FC Pune City for 2017-18 ISL season.

Chennaiyin FC
In September 2020, Fanai signed a one-year deal with Chennaiyin FC.

International career
On 11 June 2015, Chhuantea made his debut for the India national football team in the 2018 FIFA World Cup Qualifier against Oman.

Career statistics

Club

International

Honours

Bengaluru FC
Indian Federation Cup: 2014–15
I-League: 2015–16

India
 SAFF Championship: 2015

References

External links 
 Profile at Goal.com

1989 births
Living people
Indian footballers
I-League players
Shillong Lajong FC players
Footballers from Mizoram
People from Mamit district
Bengaluru FC players
Mumbai City FC players
Indian Super League players
Association football midfielders
Association football fullbacks